Parastin u Zanyari (Kurdish for protection and information) is a government agency and the primary investigative arm belonging to the Kurdistan Regional Government in Iraqi Kurdistan. The organization is now a governmental agency that was established after combining and uniting Kurdistan Democratic Party's (KDP) intelligence service (called Parastin) and Patriotic Union of Kurdistan's (PUK) intelligence service (called Zanyari) under the name of Parastin u Zanyari. Parastin was first established in 1968 by the KDP. Parastin u Zanyari has been sometimes referred to as a "Kurdish intelligence service". The primary function of the agency is investigation of crimes relating to both the internal and external security of the Kurdistan region. The agency officially has no power to arrest or detain but shares intelligence with the Kurdistan intelligence agency, Asayish, which holds jurisdiction over a number of crimes in the region including terrorism.

Although founded and funded by the KDP and PUK, it officially acts under the command of the Kurdistan Regional Government.

References

Iraqi Kurdish organizations
Iraqi intelligence agencies
Law enforcement in Iraq
Kurdistan Region (Iraq)